The 2009 KNSB Dutch Single Distance Championships was held from Friday 31 October until Sunday 2 November 2008 at the Thialf ice stadium in Heerenveen. Although the championships were held in 2008 it was the 2009 edition as it is part of the 2008–2009 speed skating season.

Schedule

Medalists

Men

Source: www.schaatsen.nl  & SchaatsStatistieken.nl

Women

Source: www.schaatsen.nl  & SchaatsStatistieken.nl

References

External links
 KNSB
 Official Website

Dutch Single Distance Championships
Single Distance Championships
NSB Dutch Single Distance Championships
NSB Dutch Single Distance Championships
2009 Single Distance
KNSB Dutch Single Distance Championships, 2009